Coraline is a 2009 American stop-motion animated dark fantasy horror film written and directed by Henry Selick and based on Neil Gaiman's novella of the same name. Produced by Laika as the studio's first feature film, it features the voice talents of Dakota Fanning, Teri Hatcher, Jennifer Saunders, Dawn French, Keith David, John Hodgman, Robert Bailey Jr., and Ian McShane. The film tells the story of its titular character discovering an idealized parallel universe behind a secret door in her new home, unaware that it contains a dark and sinister secret.

Just as Gaiman was finishing his novella in 2002, he met Selick and invited him to make a film adaptation, as Gaiman was a fan of Selick's The Nightmare Before Christmas. When Selick thought that a direct adaptation would lead to "maybe a 47-minute movie", the screenplay had some expansions, like the introduction of Wybie, who was not present in the original novel. Selick invited Japanese illustrator Tadahiro Uesugi to become the concept artist upon discovering his work, when looking for a design away from that of most animation. His biggest influences were on the color palette, which was muted in reality and more colorful in the Other World, similar to The Wizard of Oz. To capture stereoscopy for the 3D release, the animators shot each frame from two slightly apart camera positions. Production of the stop-motion animation feature took place at a warehouse in Hillsboro, Oregon. Bruno Coulais composed the film's musical score.

The film was theatrically released in the United States on February 6, 2009 by Focus Features after a world premiere at the Portland International Film Festival on February 5, and received critical acclaim. The film grossed $16.85 million during its opening weekend, ranking third at the box office, and by the end of its run had grossed over $124 million worldwide, making it the third-highest-grossing stop-motion film of all time after Chicken Run and Wallace & Gromit: The Curse of the Were-Rabbit. The film won Annie Awards for Best Music in an Animated Feature Production, Best Character Design in an Animated Feature Production and Best Production Design in an Animated Feature Production, and received nominations for an Academy Award for Best Animated Feature and a Golden Globe Award for Best Animated Feature Film. It has since developed a cult following in the years since its release.

Plot
Coraline Jones struggles to adapt to her new life after she and her workaholic parents move from Pontiac, Michigan, to the Pink Palace Apartments in Ashland, Oregon. She meets the landlady's grandson, Wyborne "Wybie" Lovat, and a stray black cat. Later, Wybie gives her a button-eyed ragdoll from his grandmother's trunk that eerily resembles Coraline. The doll guides Coraline to a small door in her apartment with a bricked up wall behind it.

That night, a mouse leads Coraline back to the door, now a portal leading to a parallel universe, where Coraline meets her Other Mother and Father, button-eyed doppelgängers of her parents who appear more attentive and caring. She returns home the next morning, where Wybie recounts the disappearance of his great-aunt. Coraline's neighbors Sergei Alexander Bobinsky, an eccentric Chernobyl liquidator-turned-gymnast who owns a mouse circus, and retired burlesque actresses April Spink and Miriam Forcible. All three of them cryptically warn Coraline about imminent danger.

Despite the warnings, Coraline visits the Other World twice more. Accompanied by the mute Other Wybie, she is entertained by the dimension's doppelgängers of her neighbors and meets the cat, who can traverse between the two worlds and speaks in the Other World. On Coraline's third visit, the Other Mother offers to let her stay in the Other World permanently, in exchange for having buttons sewn over her eyes. Horrified, Coraline tries to escape back to her world, but the Other Mother imprisons her in a room behind a mirror.

There, the ghosts of past victims, including Wybie's great-aunt, tell Coraline how the Other Mother, whom they call the Beldam, used ragdolls of themselves to spy and lure them to the Other World. After accepting the Beldam's offer to sew buttons over their eyes, she robbed them of their souls. The ghosts explain that they can only be freed by retrieving the essences of their souls, which the Beldam has hidden throughout the Other World. Coraline promises to do so, and is rescued by the Other Wybie, who helps her return home.

Coraline realizes the Beldam has kidnapped her parents, forcing her to return to the Other World. Accompanied by the cat, Coraline proposes a game: if she can find her parents and the essences of the ghosts' souls, they will all go free; if not, she will finally accept the Beldam's offer. The Beldam agrees and Coraline searches for the souls' essences, discovering that the Beldam murdered the Other Wybie for his defiance. As she finds each essence, parts of the Other World turn lifeless as the entire dimension eventually disintegrates.

Coraline encounters the Beldam in her true arachnid-like form, and the ghost of Wybie's great-aunt warns that the Beldam will not honor her bargain. Tricking the Beldam into opening the door to the real world by claiming that her parents are behind it, Coraline throws the cat at her and rescues her parents, who are trapped in a snow globe. Coraline narrowly escapes through the door, severing the Beldam's right hand.

Back home, Coraline reunites with her parents, who have forgotten about their capture. That night, the ghosts appear in Coraline's dream and thank her for freeing them, but warn that the Beldam is still after the key needed to unlock the door. Coraline decides to drop the key down an old well, but the Beldam's severed hand attacks her. Wybie arrives and, after a struggle, destroys the hand with a large rock. The duo toss the key and the hand's remnants into the well and seal it. The next day, Coraline and her parents host a party for their neighbors, including Wybie's grandmother, whom Coraline and Wybie prepare to tell about her missing sister's fate.

Voice cast
 Dakota Fanning as Coraline Jones
 Teri Hatcher as Melanie "Mel" Jones and The Beldam (also known as The Other Mother)
 Jennifer Saunders as April Spink and her Other World counterpart
 Dawn French as Miriam Forcible and her Other World counterpart
 John Hodgman as Charlie Jones and The Other Father
 John Linnell provides the Other Father's singing voice
 Robert Bailey Jr. as Wyborne "Wybie" Lovat
 Keith David as The Cat
 Ian McShane as Sergei Alexander Bobinsky and his Other World counterpart
 Carolyn Crawford as Mrs. Lovat
 Aankha Neal, George Selick, and Hannah Kaiser as the Ghost Children
 Marina Budovsky and Harry Selick as Coraline's friends back in Pontiac, Michigan

Production

Director Henry Selick met author Neil Gaiman just as Gaiman was finishing the novel Coraline, and given that Gaiman was a fan of Selick's The Nightmare Before Christmas, he invited him to make a possible film adaptation. As Selick thought a direct adaptation would lead to "maybe a 47-minute movie", his screenplay had some expansions, such as the creation of Wybie, who was not present in the original novel. When looking for a design away from that of most animation, Selick discovered the work of Japanese illustrator Tadahiro Uesugi and invited him to become the concept artist. One of Uesugi's biggest influences was on the color palette, which was muted in reality and more colorful in the Other World, similar to The Wizard of Oz. Uesugi declared that "at the beginning, it was supposed to be a small project over a few weeks to simply create characters; however, I ended up working on the project for over a year, eventually designing sets and backgrounds, on top of drawing the basic images for the story to be built upon."

Coraline was staged in a 140,000-square-foot (13,000 m2) warehouse in Hillsboro, Oregon. The stage was divided into 50 lots, which played host to nearly 150 sets. Among the sets were three miniature Victorian mansions, a 42-foot (12.8 m) apple orchard, and a model of Ashland, Oregon, including tiny details such as banners for the Oregon Shakespeare Festival. More than 28 animators worked at a time on rehearsing or shooting scenes, producing 90–100 seconds of finished animation each week. To capture stereoscopy for the 3D release, the animators shot each frame from two slightly apart camera positions.

Every object on screen was made for the film. The crew used three 3D printing systems from Objet in the development and production of the film. Thousands of high-quality 3D models, ranging from facial expressions to doorknobs, were printed in 3D using the Polyjet matrix systems, which enable the fast transformation of CAD (computer-aided design) drawings into high-quality 3D models. The puppets had separate parts for the upper and lower parts of the head that could be exchanged for different facial expressions, and the characters of Coraline could potentially exhibit over 208,000 facial expressions.
Computer artists composited separately-shot elements together, or added elements of their own, which had to look handcrafted instead of computer-generated – for instance, the flames were done with traditional animation and painted digitally, and the fog was dry ice.

At its peak, the film involved the efforts of 450 people, including from 30 to 35 animators and digital designers in the Digital Design Group (DDG), directed by Dan Casey, and more than 250 technicians and designers. One crew member, Althea Crome,  was hired specifically to knit miniature sweaters and other clothing for the puppet characters, sometimes using knitting needles as thin as human hair. The clothes also simulated wear using paint and a file.

Music

The soundtrack for Coraline features songs composed by French composer Bruno Coulais, with one ("Other Father Song") by They Might Be Giants. The Other Father's singing voice is provided by John Linnell, one of the singers from the band. They had initially written 10 songs for the film; when a melancholy tone was decided, all but one were cut. Coulais' score was performed by the Hungarian Symphony Orchestra and features choral pieces sung by the Children's Choir of Nice in a nonsense language. Selick mentions that the main soloist, "a young girl you hear singing in several parts of the film," is coincidentally named Coraline. Coraline won Coulais the 2009 Annie Award for best score for an animated feature.

Release
Coraline was theatrically released on February 6, 2009.

Home media
The film was released on DVD and Blu-ray in the United States on July 21, 2009, by Universal Studios Home Entertainment. A 3-D version comes with four sets of 3-D glasses—specifically the green-magenta anaglyph image. Coraline was released on DVD and Blu-ray in the United Kingdom on October 12, 2009. A 3-D version of the film was also released on a 2-Disc Collector's Edition. The DVD opened to first week sales of 1,036,845 and over $19 million in revenue. Total sales stand at over 2.6 million units and over $45 million in revenue. A two-disc Blu-ray 3D set, which includes a stereoscopic 3D on the first disc and an anaglyph 3D image, was released in 2011. A new edition from Shout! Factory under license from Universal was released on August 31, 2021.

Other media
The website for Coraline involves an interactive exploration game where the player can scroll through Coraline's world. It won the 2009 Webby Award for "Best Use of Animation or Motion Graphics", both by the people and the Webby organization. It was also nominated for the Webby "Movie and Film" category. On June 16, 2008, D3 Publisher announced the release of a video game based on the film. It was developed by Papaya Studio for the Wii and PlayStation 2 and by Art Co. for Nintendo DS. It was released on January 27, 2009, close to the film's theatrical release. The soundtrack was released digitally February 3, 2009, by E1 Music, and in stores on February 24, 2009.

Promo Merchandise 
For the release of the film, in 2009, NECA received the license to create merchandise months before the release of the film. Four "Bendy Fashion Dolls," of Coraline were produced as well as a couple other character's that were never released according to Victoria Rose, Toy Maker previously hired by Laika, via. In addition to the four dolls NECA also released 3 packs of mini "PVC Figures," these sets included figures such as Wybie, Mr. Bobinsky, The Beldam and the ghost children. Much more merchandise such as lunch boxes, gloves, watches, pins and stationery were also released by NECA for the initial release of the film, in 2009. Since then, these pieces of merchandise have grown a cult following with fans paying into the hundreds or even thousands to add to their collections.

Reception

Box office
According to Paul Dergarabedian, a film business analyst with Media by Numbers, for the film to succeed it needed a box office comparable to Wallace & Gromit: The Curse of the Were-Rabbit, which had grossed $16 million its opening weekend and ended up making more than $192 million worldwide; prior to the film's release, Dergarabedian thought Laika Studios "should be really pleased" were Coraline to make $10 million in its opening weekend. In its US opening weekend, the film grossed $16.85 million, ranking third at the box office. It made $15 million during its second weekend, bringing its U.S. total up to $35.6 million, $25.5 million of which came from 3D presentations. As of November 2009, the film has grossed $75,286,229 in the United States and Canada and $49,310,169 in other territories, for a total of $124,596,398 worldwide.

Critical response
On the review aggregation website Rotten Tomatoes, the film holds an approval rating of 90% based on 271 reviews, with an average rating of 7.80/10. The website's critical consensus reads, "With its vivid stop-motion animation combined with Neil Gaiman's imaginative story, Coraline is a film that's both visually stunning and wondrously entertaining." On Metacritic, the film has a weighted average score of 80 out of 100 based on reviews from 38 critics, indicating "generally favorable reviews".

Roger Ebert gave the film three stars out of four, calling it "a beautiful film about several nasty people", as well as "nightmare fodder for children, however brave, under a certain age." David Edelstein said the film is "a bona fide fairy tale" that needed a "touch less entrancement and a touch more ... story." A. O. Scott of The New York Times called the film "exquisitely realized," with a "slower pace and a more contemplative tone than the novel. It is certainly exciting, but rather than race through ever noisier set pieces toward a hectic climax in the manner of so much animation aimed at kids, Coraline lingers in an atmosphere that is creepy, wonderfully strange and full of feeling."

Accolades

See also
 List of ghost films

References

External links

 
 
 
 
 
 
 
 

2009 films
2009 horror films
2009 animated films
2009 fantasy films
2000s ghost films
2009 3D films
3D animated films
2000s children's films
2000s American animated films
American animated horror films
American children's animated fantasy films
American ghost films
American 3D films
Clay animation films
Films about witchcraft
2000s stop-motion animated films
American dark fantasy films
American fantasy drama films
American horror drama films
Animated films about cats
Animated films about children
Children's horror films
Films set in Oregon
Films shot in Oregon
Films based on British novels
Films based on horror novels
Films based on fantasy novels
Films based on works by Neil Gaiman
Laika (company) animated films
Focus Features animated films
Focus Features films
Films directed by Henry Selick
Films based on short fiction
Films about parallel universes
Films set in apartment buildings
Animated films based on novels
Annecy Cristal for a Feature Film winners
American supernatural drama films
American supernatural horror films
American animated feature films
Films scored by Bruno Coulais
Supernatural fantasy films
Talking animals in fiction
2000s English-language films